List of champions of the 1893 U.S. National Championships tennis tournament (now known as the US Open). The men's singles competition was held from 22 August to 28 August on the outdoor grass courts at the Newport Casino in Newport, Rhode Island. The men's doubles event was played at the St. George Cricket Club in Chicago from July 25 through July 29. The women's singles and doubles events, as well as the mixed doubles, were held from 20 June to 23 June on the outdoor grass courts at the Philadelphia Cricket Club in Philadelphia, Pennsylvania. It was the 13th U.S. National Championships and the second Grand Slam tournament of the year.

Finals

Men's singles

 Robert Wrenn defeated  Oliver Campbell  	w/o

Women's singles

 Aline Terry defeated  Augusta Schultz  6–1, 6–3

Men's doubles
 Clarence Hobart /  Fred Hovey defeated  Oliver Campbell /  Bob Huntington 6–4, 6–4, 4–6, 6–2

Women's doubles
 Aline Terry /  Harriet Butler defeated  Augusta Schultz /  Ms Stone 6–4, 6–3

Mixed doubles
 Ellen Roosevelt /  Clarence Hobart defeated  Ethel Bankson /  Robert Willson Jr. 6–1, 4–6, 10–8, 6–1

References

External links
Official US Open website

 
U.S. National Championships
U.S. National Championships (tennis) by year
1893 in sports in Rhode Island
1893 in sports in Pennsylvania
June 1893 sports events
August 1893 sports events